Puimolar is a locality located in the municipality of Arén, in Huesca province, Aragon, Spain. As of 2020, it has a population of 2.

Geography 
Puimolar is located 142km east-northeast of Huesca.

References

Populated places in the Province of Huesca